Park Jung-hee (born 10 October 1967) is a South Korean sport shooter who competed in the 1988 Summer Olympics and in the 1996 Summer Olympics.

References

1967 births
Living people
South Korean female sport shooters
ISSF pistol shooters
Olympic shooters of South Korea
Shooters at the 1988 Summer Olympics
Shooters at the 1996 Summer Olympics
Shooters at the 1986 Asian Games
Shooters at the 1994 Asian Games
Shooters at the 2002 Asian Games
Asian Games medalists in shooting
Asian Games silver medalists for South Korea
Asian Games bronze medalists for South Korea
Medalists at the 1994 Asian Games
Medalists at the 2002 Asian Games
20th-century South Korean women
21st-century South Korean women